Mersin İdmanyurdu (also Mersin İdman Yurdu, Mersin İY, or MİY) Sports Club; located in Mersin, east Mediterranean coast of Turkey in 1970–71. The 1970–71 season was the fourth season of Mersin İdmanyurdu (MİY) football team in Turkish First Football League, the first level division in Turkey. They finished eleventh in the league. They also took place in Turkish Cup and eliminated at second round.

Mehmet Karamehmet was president. Erol Tarhan was general captain. Mahir Turhan, Sezai Sak, Orhan Mutlu were executive committee member.

Pre-season
MİY opened new season on 10.08.1970. Preparation games:
 23.08.1970 - Bursaspor-MİY.
 05.09.1970 - Galatasaray-MİY: 2-0. Saturday 17:00. Ali Sami Yen Stadium, İstanbul. Referees: Nazif Oturgan, Necmettin Çakan, Adnan Paksüt. Galatasaray: Nihat (Yasin), Ekrem, Tuncay, Muzaffer, Aydın, Ahmet, Ergün, Uğur, Gökmen, Metin, Ayhan. Goals: Metin 10', Gökmen 40'. Coach: Coşkun Özarı. MİY: Fikret, Taner, B.Erol, Cihat, Mustafa, Refik, Akın, Ayhan, Osman, İbrahim, Alp, Muharrem. Coach: Bülent Giz.

1970–71 First League participation
First League was played with 16 teams in its 13th season, 1970–71. Last two teams relegated to Second League 1971–72. Mersin İY became 11th with 11 wins, and Osman Arpacıoğlu was most scorer player with 14 goals

Results summary
Mersin İdmanyurdu (MİY) 1970–71 First League summary:

Sources: 1970–71 Turkish First Football League pages.

League table
Mersin İY's league performance in First League in 1970–71 season is shown in the following table. At the end of the season coach Bülent Giz declared that he will no longer train the team in the next season.

Note: Won, drawn and lost points are 2, 1 and 0. F belongs to MİY and A belongs to corresponding team for both home and away matches.

Results by round
Results of games MİY played in 1970–71 First League by rounds:

First half

Second half

1970–71 Turkish Cup participation
1970–71  Turkish Cup was played for the 9th season as Türkiye Kupası by 25 teams. Two elimination rounds (including one preliminary round) and finals were played in two-legs elimination system. Mersin İdmanyurdu participated in 1970–71  Turkish Cup from the first round and was eliminated at second round by Eskişehirspor. Eskişehirspor won the Cup for the first time.

Cup track
The drawings and results Mersin İdmanyurdu (MİY) followed in 1970–71 Turkish Cup are shown in the following table.

Note: In the above table 'Score' shows For and Against goals whether the match played at home or not.

Game details
Mersin İdmanyurdu (MİY) 1970–71 Turkish Cup game reports is shown in the following table.
Kick off times are in EET and EEST.

Source: 1970–71 Turkish Cup pages.

Management

Club management
Mehmet Karamehmet was club president.

Coaching team

1970–71 Mersin İdmanyurdu head coaches:

Note: Only official games were included.

1970–71 squad
Stats are counted for 1970–71 First League matches and 1970–71 Turkish Cup (Türkiye Kupası) matches. In the team rosters four substitutes were allowed to appear, two of whom were substitutable. Only the players who appeared in game rosters were included and listed in the order of appearance.

Sources: 1970–71 season squad data from maçkolik com, Milliyet, and Erbil (1975).

News from Milliyet:
 Akın, Muhlis and Naşit were transferred from Galatasaray, 14.07.1970. 
 Erol was included in "Ümit milli takım" (U-21 national team) for Balkan U-21 championship in Sofia between 8–15 June 1970.
 Transfers out: At end of the season Muharrem (Fenerbahçe), forward Osman (Fenerbahçe), Ayhan and Refik were transferred out. Tarık went to Giresunspor in mid-season.

See also
 Football in Turkey
 1970–71 Turkish First Football League
 1970–71 Turkish Cup

Notes and references

Mersin İdman Yurdu seasons
Turkish football clubs 1970–71 season